James Willard "Jay" Powell (born January 9, 1972) is an American former baseball pitcher who last played for the Atlanta Braves.

His last game was on July 29, 2005, when he fractured his humerus.

Powell was the winning pitcher of Game 7 of the 1997 World Series for the Florida Marlins. He also has the most consecutive seasons pitched without a losing record among pitchers who primarily pitched in relief.

References

External links

  Transactions

1972 births
Living people
Atlanta Braves players
Texas Rangers players
Florida Marlins players
Houston Astros players
Major League Baseball pitchers
Baseball players from Mississippi
Sportspeople from Meridian, Mississippi
Baseball players from Atlanta
Albany Polecats players
Frederick Keys players
Portland Sea Dogs players
Brevard County Manatees players
Round Rock Express players
New Orleans Zephyrs players
Tulsa Drillers players
Oklahoma RedHawks players
Gulf Coast Braves players
Mississippi Braves players
Mississippi State Bulldogs baseball players
American expatriate baseball players in Australia
Perth Heat players
Anchorage Glacier Pilots players